The women's triple jump event  at the 1993 IAAF World Indoor Championships was held on 13 and 14 March.

Medalists

Results

Qualification
Qualification: 13.50 (Q) or at least 12 best performers (q) qualified for the final.

Final

References

Triple
Triple jump at the World Athletics Indoor Championships
1993 in women's athletics